Leonard Dick is a television writer and producer who writes for The Good Wife.

Leonard was born in Toronto, Ontario, and attended high school at Upper Canada College, where he was elected head of Howard's House, and thus served on the Board of Stewards. He graduated from Harvard University with both a BA and MBA.

He worked on the first two seasons of the ABC television series Lost, garnering him a Writers Guild of America (WGA) Award, as well as an Emmy for best Drama. Dick and the writing staff won the WGA Award for Best Dramatic Series at the February 2006 ceremony for their work on the first and second seasons of Lost. They were nominated for the WGA Award for Best Dramatic Series again at the February 2007 ceremony for their work on the second and third seasons.

Other series he has written for include House, The Mentalist, Fastlane, Hack, Family Law, and the Fox sketch comedy Mad TV.

Television credits
 Lost (2004) TV Series
 1x17: ...In Translation
 1x21: The Greater Good
 2x02: Adrift
 2x08: Collision
 2x13: The Long Con
 2x19: S.O.S.
House (2004) TV Series
 3x11: Words and Deeds
 3x23  The Jerk
 4x02  The Right Stuff
 4x12  Don't Ever Change
 5x20  Simple Explanation

References

External links

Living people
Upper Canada College alumni
Canadian expatriate writers in the United States
Canadian television writers
Writers from Toronto
Writers Guild of America Award winners
Harvard Business School alumni
Year of birth missing (living people)